Hebius sangzhiensis, the Sangzhi keelback snake, is a species of snake of the family Colubridae. It is endemic to Hunan, South Central China. The specific name sangzhiensis refers to its type locality, Sangzhi County.

References 

sangzhiensis
Snakes of China
Endemic fauna of China
Reptiles described in 2019